The Saint Paul's Church (Dutch: Sint-Pauluskerk) is a Roman Catholic church building in Vaals, Netherlands. The neogothic cross shaped church was built in 1891-1893 by Johannes Kayser, replacing an earlier Saint Paul's Church nearby. The building is used as parish church for the local Saint Paul parish. Patron saint for the church is Saint Paul. It has been listed as a rijksmonument, making it a national heritage site of the Netherlands.

Gallery of images

References 

Churches in Limburg (Netherlands)
Rijksmonuments in Limburg
Vaals
Gothic Revival church buildings in the Netherlands
Roman Catholic churches completed in 1893
19th-century Roman Catholic church buildings in the Netherlands